Hirstionyssidae is a family of mites in the order Mesostigmata.

The family Hirstionyssidae has recently been treated as a subfamily of Laelapidae rather than an independent family.

Species

Ancoranyssus Evans & Fain, 1968
 Ancoranyssus trichys Evans & Fain, 1968
Hirstionyssus Fonseca, 1948
 Hirstionyssus alvarezi Bassols-Batalla, Quintero-Martinez, Moreno-Moreno & Vessi-Lobato, 1991
 Hirstionyssus anisochaetus Liu & Ma, 2003
 Hirstionyssus ansaiensis Huang, 1990
 Hirstionyssus arcuatus (C.L.Koch, 1839)
 Hirstionyssus carnifex (C.L. Koch, 1839)
 Hirstionyssus chungwalii Mo, 1979
 Hirstionyssus citelli Huang, 1990
 Hirstionyssus cuonai Wang & Pan, in Wang, Pan & Yan 1994
 Hirstionyssus davydovae Nikolsky, 1984
 Hirstionyssus gansuensis Mal & Piao, 1987
 Hirstionyssus giganteus Zemskaya & Lange, 1979
 Hirstionyssus huangheensis Mal & Piao, 1987
 Hirstionyssus improvisus Koyumdzheva, 1978
 Hirstionyssus indochinensis Bregetova & Grohovskaja, 1961
 Hirstionyssus kutscheruki Zemskaya & Lange, 1979
 Hirstionyssus laterispinatus Mal & Piao, 1987
 Hirstionyssus martinezi Ramirez, Bassols & Santillan, 1980
 Hirstionyssus meridianus Zemskaja, 1955
 Hirstionyssus montanus Huang, 1990
 Hirstionyssus ningxiaensis Gu, Bai & Ding, 1988
 Hirstionyssus nitedulae Koyumdzheva, 1978
 Hirstionyssus pauli Willmann, 1952
 Hirstionyssus phodopi Bai & Gu, 1989
 Hirstionyssus posterospinus Wang & Yan, in Wang, Pan & Yan 1994
 Hirstionyssus pratentis Gu & Yang, 1986
 Hirstionyssus punctatus Gu & Yang, 1986
 Hirstionyssus qinghaiensis Gu & Yang, 1986
 Hirstionyssus sciurinus (Hirst, 1921)
 Hirstionyssus staffordi Strandtmann & Hunt, 1951
 Hirstionyssus xinghaiensis Mal & Piao, 1987
 Hirstionyssus zaisanica Senotrusova, 1987
Pseudancoranyssus A.Fain, 1991
 Pseudancoranyssus ruwenzoriensis A. Fain, 1991
Thadeua Domrow, 1977
 Thadeua greeni (Domrow, 1966)
 Thadeua mitchelli (Womersley, 1956)
 Thadeua rosamondae (Domrow, 1973)
 Thadeua serrata Domrow, 1977
 Thadeua validipes (Domrow, 1955)
Trichosurolaelaps Womersley, 1956
 Trichosurolaelaps crassipes Womersley, 1956
 Trichosurolaelaps dixous Domrow, 1972
 Trichosurolaelaps fallax Domrow, 1972
 Trichosurolaelaps harrisoni Domrow, 1961
 Trichosurolaelaps marra Domrow, 1972
 Trichosurolaelaps striatus Domrow, 1958

References

Mesostigmata
Acari families